"The Wettest Stories Ever Told" is the eighteenth episode of the seventeenth season of the American animated television series The Simpsons. It originally aired on the Fox network in the United States on April 23, 2006.

Plot
When the Simpsons' plans for an outing at the Frying Dutchman turns into a disaster due to an uncooperative octopus, the family tells three nautically themed stories.

Mayflower Madman
In Lisa's story, Bart, Lisa and a widowed Marge board the Mayflower to head for the new world. Homer, fleeing from the police, boards the ship and hides in a barrel. Homer is immediately attracted to Marge, however, Moe is instantly jealous of their friendship. Moe takes Homer down to the storage room to play a drinking game. Homer and the crew get drunk, and Moe claims that Homer is responsible, leading Captain "Flandish" (Flanders) and Reverend Lovejoy to place him in a stock.

A storm approaches, and Flandish is knocked unconscious. Homer volunteers to take his place, and leads them safely out of the storm. Homer and Marge get together, and the members of the Mayflower meet the Wampanoag tribe and join them for the first Thanksgiving feast.

The Whine-Bar Sea
In Bart's story, the Bounty sets sail from England in 1789, commanded by Captain Bligh (Seymour Skinner). During the voyage, Bligh severely mistreats his crew. Willie warns him of a mutiny if he continues, but Bligh ignores him. They arrive in Tahiti, (where Homer and Marge are the rulers of the island) and have a wonderful time until it is time to leave.

Bligh continues to abuse the crew, leading First Mate Bart Christian, to mutiny, sending Bligh and Willie off in a lifeboat. Bart, as the new Captain, orders the crews to set sail for Tahiti, but after throwing away the ship's helm, they end up in Antarctica.

Watership D'ohn (aka, The Neptune Adventure)

Homer tells the final story, a parody of the 1972 film The Poseidon Adventure, taking place on the luxury liner S.S. Neptune on New Year's Eve during the 1970s. At midnight, Captain Burns fails to notice a massive freak wave, which hits the bridge, capsizing the ship and killing most of the passengers. Led by Selma, the survivors decide to climb up the decks to the engine room.

Comic Book Guy swims through a flooded deck to help the others get to the engine room, but he has a heart attack and drowns. The group makes it to the engine room, and are rescued, where they encounter the skeletons of the Bounty crew who are still trying to get back to Tahiti.

Reception
In its original airing, the episode was watched by 7 million viewers, the lowest ratings of season 17.

References

External links 
 

The Simpsons (season 17) episodes
2006 American television episodes
HMS Bounty in fiction
Fiction set in the 1970s
Tahiti in fiction